Rick Elmore is an American judge who previously served as a judge of the North Carolina Court of Appeals.

Elmore earned his undergraduate degree in 1974 from Guilford College in North Carolina, and worked for the North Carolina Department of Correction before earning his  Juris Doctor (J.D.) degree from North Carolina Central University in 1982. He practiced law in Greensboro, North Carolina for twenty years before being elected to an eight-year term on the North Carolina Court of Appeals in 2002 as a Republican. Elmore chose not to run for a third term in 2018.

He is divorced and has two children.

References

External links
 Elmore official campaign site
 Official biography
Judgepedia entry

North Carolina Court of Appeals judges
North Carolina Central University alumni
Guilford College alumni
Living people
North Carolina Republicans
Year of birth missing (living people)